Formica japonica is a species of ant in the genus Formica. It is found in Russian (Far East), Mongolia, China, Korea, Japan, and Taiwan. It is one of the most common ants in Japan.

References

External links

japonica
Insects described in 1866
Hymenoptera of Asia